Kristian Antila (born January 10, 1980) is a Finnish former professional ice hockey goaltender.  He played in the SM-liiga for Ilves and Ässät. He was drafted 113th overall by the Edmonton Oilers in the 1998 NHL Entry Draft.  He retired in 2005 due to a groin injury.

External links

1980 births
Living people
AIK IF players
Ässät players
Columbus Cottonmouths (ECHL) players
Edmonton Oilers draft picks
Finnish ice hockey goaltenders
Hamilton Bulldogs (AHL) players
Ilves players
Luleå HF players
Wichita Thunder players